Motherway Island is a small rocky island about  north of Peterson Island, near the south end of the Windmill Islands of Antarctica. It was first mapped from aerial photographs taken by U.S. Navy Operation Highjump in February 1947, and was named by the Advisory Committee on Antarctic Names for Paul T. Motherway, a member of one of the two Operation Windmill photographic units which obtained aerial and ground photographic coverage of this area in January 1948.

See also 
 List of antarctic and sub-antarctic islands

References

Windmill Islands